Gaia, Inc., formerly Gaiam, is an American alternative media video streaming service and online community focusing on fringe-science and yoga. Founded by Jirka Rysavy in 1988, its brands include Gaiam TV; the latter's name was changed to Gaia in 2016.

The platform contains video and written articles on yoga, psychedelics and pseudoscience. Hosted media topics focus on fringe theories, conspiracy theories, and alternative medicine.

History

Early history 
Gaiam was founded in Boulder, Colorado in 1988 by Jirka Rysavy. His vision was to serve the "conscious consumer," a group subsequently named the "Cultural Creatives" by sociologist Paul Ray in 1996: educated consumers who make purchasing decisions based on their values.

The company states that its original name was the result of fusing "Gaia", a mother earth deity, with the phrase "I am", for the "interconnectivity of all things".

In 2001, it merged with the Californian company Real Goods Solar. In 2005, Gaiam acquired the media assets of GoodTimes Entertainment and Jetlag Productions. In 2003, the company bought a 50.1% share in its UK distributor Leisure Systems International (LSI). In 2007, Gaiam acquired both Lime.com and Zaadz.com for a greater community presence.

Recent history 
In 2011, the company launched Gaiam TV, a streaming service for videos on yoga, meditation, and fringe science, renamed to Gaia in 2015.

In 2012, Gaiam acquired Vivendi Entertainment, a DVD distributor from Vivendi subsidiary Universal Music Group Distribution, merging it with its home entertainment division to form Gaiam Vivendi Entertainment. In 2019, USA Today ranked Gaia, Inc as the world's fastest-growing retailer, spending up to 120% of revenue on advertising.

In 2018, criticism by a filmmaker formerly employed by Gaia, Patty Greer, ended with a public apology to Gaia after she accused them of "promoting Luciferianism and using directed-energy weapons against critics."

In June 2019, Gaia started live streaming events from a new event center at its Louisville campus. Events are live streamed in 185 countries with simultaneous translation, and feature speakers such as Gregg Braden, Caroline Myss, Bruce Lipton, and Graham Hancock. In November 2021, American singer and actor Demi Lovato announced that they had become an ambassador for Gaia.

Meditation intention experiment 

From September 30 to October 5, 2017, Lynne McTaggart hosted an American Peace Intention Experiment, broadcast on Gaia TV. The experiment involved large numbers of people participating in group meditation specifically directed at decreasing violent crime in Fairground, an area around Natural Bridge Avenue in Northern St. Louis, Missouri, which was rated the most dangerous street in America. For six months after the experiment. Jessica Utts, a University of California professor of statistics, analyzed four sets of crime data in St. Louis from September 2014 to March 2018 to determine what effect the Experiment had on crime. From October 2017 to March 2018, property crime increased in Fairground, but violent crime decreased. McTaggart reported that she did not know if the change in crime levels was caused by the Experiment or not, but that she continued to have hope. This decrease in violent crime according to Utts was 45%, in contrast to a national decrease of 0.9% during the same year nationally

Programming 
Gaia provides four primary channels - Seeking Truth, Transformation, Alternative Healing, and Yoga - to subscribers in 185 countries, streaming more than 8,000 films. Gaia surpassed 500,000 paid subscribers on September 13, 2018. Topics range from mainstream (mindfulness meditation, basic yoga) to highly fringe (psychics, aliens, illuminati, energy healing,):

 Astrology, the pseudoscience of attempting to divine the future based on the movements of celestial bodies.
 Metaphysics, a branch of philosophy that studies ideas about the nature of reality and being, and includes ontology, cosmology, and epistemology. Gaia offers fringe metaphysical content, with a focus on Western esotericism topics such as universal consciousness and energy.
 Pseudo-archaeology, fringe theories on ongoing archaeological debates that are far from the mainstream. Gaia's programming ranges from discussion of Turkey's Gobekli Tepe archeological site, through to theories on how aliens built the pyramids on Earth as well as on Mars.
 Alchemy, an ancient practice of attempting to transmute matter and create elixiers of everlasting life. It is promoted as a current pseudoscience via Gaia's alchemy-focused programs hosted by Theresa Bullard.
 Mysticism, topics such as the classification of mystical experiences, and their nature in different religions and mystical traditions. Mystics differ from culture to culture (e.g. shamans, theurgists, Daoists, Kabbalists, Western esotericians, Buddhists, or Christians). Programs on Gaia address primarily New Age and Eastern mysticism.
 Kundalini, a primal force or energy thought, believed in by some Hindu practices, and proposed to be controllable by yoga, meditation, or chanting. Gaia has beginner and moderate Kundalini yoga videos.
 Alternative medicine, non-scientific or counterfactual attempts to replicate the healing effects of the medicine. A large portion of Gaia's content centers on energy healing, naturopathy, traditional chinese medicine, Ayurveda or time travel.
 Nutrition, the diet and nutrients necessary to maintain life and health. Some of Gaia's content promotes balanced diets and some were created in a partnership with Mayo Clinic (though this partnership has been controversial). It also promotes practices such as detox, superfoods or Paleolithic diet.
 Meditation, the mental practice of focusing on a particular object, thought, or activity to improve one's mind, shown to be valuable for relaxation and stress reduction. Gaia offers different meditation series that range from established relaxation meditation to highly fringe attempts to control reality or cross into parallel universes.

A show hosted by George Noory, covers several pseudoscientific topics such as psychic vampires, Hollow Earth theory, and mummified aliens. This content has been criticized as misleading or falsified.

Conspiracy theories 
Topics covered by Gaia include the assassination of John F. Kennedy, Operation Paperclip, Project MKUltra, and Big Pharma conspiracy theories. Gaia's programming also discusses topics such as research on psychedelics used as medicine, like that performed by the Johns Hopkins Psychedelic Research Unit; and UFO research, including that by government programs, such as the Pentagon’s Advanced Aerospace Threat Identification Program.

References

External links
 

1988 establishments in Colorado
American companies established in 1988
Mass media companies established in 1988
Entertainment companies of the United States
Internet television streaming services
Yoga organizations
Companies based in Boulder County, Colorado
GoodTimes Entertainment
Conspiracist media
Yoga mass media
Conspiracy theories in the United States
New Age